Kinyras or KINYRAS may refer to:
Cinyras, mythological son of Apollo and father of Adonis
APOP Kinyras Peyias FC, a Cypriot football club
KINYRAS, a submarine telecommunications cable system in Cyprus